Morgan MacRae (born 13 November 2001) is a Welsh rugby union player for Henley Hawks. MacRae's primary position is hooker. MacRae previously played for the Scarlets.

Professional career

MacRae was named in the Scarlets academy squad for the 2021–22 season. MacRae made two appearances for the Scarlets develpment side in 2021, against the Dragons and Ospreys. At the end of the season, MacRae departed the Scarlets and rejoined Henley Hawks.

MacRae has represented Wales Sevens at one tournament.

References

2001 births
Living people
Scarlets players
Rugby union hookers
Welsh rugby union players